Liphistius is a genus of basal trapdoor spiders in the family Liphistiidae. They are found in Japan, China, and Southeast Asia.

Etymology
Liphistius is from the Greek leipo (lacking) and stios (equality).

Biology
Female body lengths range from 9 to 29 mm; males are slightly smaller. They live in burrows in earthen banks, on some cave walls, and probably in forests. The burrow is sealed with a thin, circular, woven door, which is disguised with soil and moss. While they spend the day deep inside their burrows, at night they wait just below the door for insects, woodlice, and similar invertebrates that stumble over one of the seven silken threads that radiate from the entrance. With a reluctance to leave their burrows, they push up the door and reach for their prey.

Species
, the World Spider Catalog accepts 67 species:

Liphistius albipes Schwendinger, 1995 – Thailand
Liphistius batuensis Abraham, 1923 – Malaysia
Liphistius bicoloripes Ono, 1988 – Thailand
Liphistius birmanicus Thorell, 1897 – Myanmar
Liphistius bristowei Platnick & Sedgwick, 1984 – Thailand
Liphistius buran Schwendinger, 2019 – Malaysia
Liphistius castaneus Schwendinger, 1995 – Thailand
Liphistius cupreus (Schwendinger & Huber, 2022) – Myanmar
Liphistius dangrek Schwendinger, 1996 – Thailand
Liphistius desultor Schiödte, 1849 (type species) – Malaysia
Liphistius endau Sedgwick & Platnick, 1987 – Malaysia
Liphistius erawan Schwendinger, 1996 – Thailand
Liphistius ferox (Schwendinger & Huber, 2022) – Myanmar
Liphistius fuscus Schwendinger, 1995 – Thailand
Liphistius gracilis Schwendinger, 2017 – Malaysia
Liphistius hatyai (Zhan & Xu, 2022) – Thailand
Liphistius hpruso Aung, Xu, Lwin, Sang, Yu, H. Liu, F. X. Liu & Li, 2019 – Myanmar
Liphistius indra Schwendinger, 2017 – Malaysia
Liphistius inthanon (Zhan & Xu, 2022) – Thailand
Liphistius isan Schwendinger, 1998 – Thailand, Laos
Liphistius jarujini Ono, 1988 – Thailand
Liphistius johore Platnick & Sedgwick, 1984 – Malaysia
Liphistius kanthan Platnick, 1997 – Malaysia
Liphistius keeratikiati (Zhan & Xu, 2022) – Thailand
Liphistius lahu Schwendinger, 1998 – Thailand
Liphistius langkawi Platnick & Sedgwick, 1984 – Malaysia
Liphistius lannaianus Schwendinger, 1990 – Thailand
Liphistius laoticus Schwendinger, 2013 – Laos
Liphistius laruticus Schwendinger, 1997 – Malaysia
Liphistius linang Schwendinger, 2017 – Malaysia
Liphistius lordae Platnick & Sedgwick, 1984 – Myanmar
Liphistius maewongensis Sivayyapram, Smith, Weingdow & Warrit, 2017 – Thailand
Liphistius malayanus Abraham, 1923 – Malaysia
Liphistius marginatus Schwendinger, 1990 – Thailand
Liphistius metopiae Schwendinger, 2022 – Thailand
Liphistius murphyorum Platnick & Sedgwick, 1984 – Malaysia
Liphistius nabang Yu, F. Zhang & J. X. Zhang, 2021 – China
Liphistius negara Schwendinger, 2017 – Malaysia
Liphistius nesioticus Schwendinger, 1996 – Thailand
Liphistius niphanae Ono, 1988 – Thailand
Liphistius ochraceus Ono & Schwendinger, 1990 – Thailand
Liphistius onoi Schwendinger, 1996 – Thailand
Liphistius ornatus Ono & Schwendinger, 1990 – Thailand
Liphistius owadai Ono & Schwendinger, 1990 – Thailand
Liphistius panching Platnick & Sedgwick, 1984 – Malaysia
Liphistius phileion Schwendinger, 1998 – Thailand
Liphistius phuketensis Schwendinger, 1998 – Thailand
Liphistius pinlaung Aung, Xu, Lwin, Sang, Yu, H. Liu, F. X. Liu & Li, 2019 – Myanmar
Liphistius platnicki (Schwendinger & Huber, 2022) – Myanmar
Liphistius priceae Schwendinger, 2017 – Malaysia
Liphistius pusohm Schwendinger, 1996 – Thailand
Liphistius pyinoolwin Xu, Yu, Aung, Yu, Liu, Lwin, Sang & Li, 2021 – Myanmar
Liphistius sayam Schwendinger, 1998 – Thailand
Liphistius schwendingeri Ono, 1988 – Thailand
Liphistius sumatranus Thorell, 1890 – Indonesia (Sumatra)
Liphistius suwat Schwendinger, 1996 – Thailand
Liphistius tanakai Ono & Aung, 2020 – Myanmar
Liphistius tempurung Platnick, 1997 – Malaysia
Liphistius tenuis Schwendinger, 1996 – Thailand
Liphistius thaleri Schwendinger, 2009 – Thailand
Liphistius tham Sedgwick & Schwendinger, 1990 – Thailand
Liphistius thoranie Schwendinger, 1996 – Thailand
Liphistius tioman Platnick & Sedgwick, 1984 – Malaysia
Liphistius trang Platnick & Sedgwick, 1984 – Thailand
Liphistius tung Schwendinger, 2022 – Myanmar
Liphistius yamasakii Ono, 1988 – Thailand
Liphistius yangae Platnick & Sedgwick, 1984 – Thailand, Malaysia

References

Further reading
 Platnick, Norman I. & Sedgewick, W.C. (1984): A revision of the spider genus Liphistius (Araneae, Mesothelae). American Museum Novitates, (New York), No 2781, 31pp.
 Whitten, T., Clements, R. & Price, L. 2013. Liphistius kanthan. In: IUCN 2013. IUCN Red List of Threatened Species. Version 2013.1. <www.iucnredlist.org>. Downloaded on 6 July 2013.

External links

Liphistius kanthan IUCN

Liphistiidae
Spiders of Asia
Mesothelae genera
Taxa named by Jørgen Matthias Christian Schiødte